Panasuan is an Austronesian language spoken in the border area of West Sulawesi and South Sulawesi provinces, Indonesia. Together with Seko Padang, Seko Tengah and Budong-Budong, it belongs to the Seko branch of the South Sulawesi subgroup.

References

External links

Languages of Sulawesi
South Sulawesi languages